LALMA is a not-for-profit organization that was established in 1999 in response to the need for Spanish-language resources on Islam. LALMA began with a group of five Latino Muslims from Los Angeles led by Marta Felicitas Galedary began having regular meetings to learn about Islam in the Spanish language. According to its mission statement, LALMA "promotes a better understanding of Islam to the Spanish speaking community and establishes a forum of spiritual nurturing and social support to Latino Muslims, building bridges among the monotheistic community and advocating for social justice in accordance with Islamic values."  Initially LALMA stood for Los Angeles Latino Muslims Association, but after a restructuring to accommodate its growth, LALMA was renamed to La Asociacion Latino Musulmana de America.

Each Sunday morning, LALMA members gather to attend Arabic lessons, receive instruction on the Quran and the biography of Muhammad (sirah), and discuss issues of interest to Muslim converts. They regularly have guest lectures on different aspects of Islam. They meet at various mosques in Southern California including Masjid Omar ibn Al-Khattab and the Islamic Center of Southern California. LALMA also provides CPR courses, first aid, and community safety courses as well as teen counseling and support to Latino dawah programs. They host and participate in interfaith events, such as with the Roman Catholic Archdiocese of Los Angeles. LALMA sponsors events such as conferences on the Islamic roots of Spain and yearly activities during Ramadan.

See also

 Alianza Islámica
 Black Muslims
 Islam in the United States
 Latin American Muslims
 Latino American Dawah Organization

References

External links
 LALMA website

Islamic charities based in the United States
Hispanic and Latino American organizations
Hispanic and Latino American culture in Los Angeles
Non-profit organizations based in Los Angeles
Islamic organizations established in 1999
Spanish-language education
Islamic education
1999 establishments in California